Westfield Innaloo is a major shopping centre in the northern suburbs of Perth.

In 2020 the shopping centre was intended to be rebranded to Westfield Stirling, but  that has not happened. Honouring James Stirling, after whom the City of Stirling is named in which Westfield Innaloo is situated and which is itself facing calls to rename, is increasingly under pressure, because Stirling personally led the attack on a group of approximately seventy Bindjareb men, women and children on 28 October 1834 now known as the Pinjarra massacre. That massacre lasted at least an hour and resulted in the deaths of one soldier and an estimated 15–30 men, women and children.

History
The shopping centre, originally known as Innaloo Shoppers Village, was developed in 1967 to service Innaloo and newly developed Woodlands. It was the second shopping centre built north of the Swan River and opened with about 30 stores plus a Boans (later Aherns) department store and Woolworths supermarket. A Target store, and a Coles Supermarkets (known as Coles New World at the time), were added to the centre in 1980.

The centre was acquired by Coles Myer in 1983. Nine years later, the centre's name was changed to Innaloo City Centre and a 375-seat food court and Kmart were added.

In 1996, Westfield Group acquired the centre and changed its name to Westfield Innaloo. In 2004–05, the centre grew in size by over 25% as more than 30 specialty stores were added and the Coles supermarket was relocated. In July 2014 the Westfield Group became two companies (Scentre Group and Westfield Corporation), with ownership and management of the centre transferring to Scentre Group. A new entrance was also built to go with previously erected signage nearby, and Westfield acquired the adjacent Centro Innaloo and renamed it Innaloo Megacentre.

Future development
In December 2019 Scentre Group announced it had deferred a redevelopment of Westfield Innaloo.

References

External links

Westfield Group
Shopping centres in Perth, Western Australia
Shopping malls established in 1967
1967 establishments in Australia
City of Stirling